The Green Bay Packers are a professional American Football team based in Green Bay, Wisconsin. Since their founding in 1919 by Curly Lambeau and George Whitney Calhoun, the Packers have played over 1,479 games in 104 seasons of competitive football. The first two seasons the Packers played against local teams in and around Wisconsin. In 1921, they became part of the American Professional Football Association, the precursor to the National Football League (NFL). In their 102 seasons, the Packers have won 13 Professional American Football Championships (the most in NFL history), including nine NFL Championships and four Super Bowls. They have captured 21 divisional titles, 9 conference championships, and have recorded the most regular season wins (790) in NFL history, tied 2nd (with the Pittsburgh Steelers) in Playoff wins (36) and have the most overall victories (826) out of all NFL franchises in the history of the league.

The franchise has experienced three major periods of continued success in their history. The first period of success came from 1929–1944, when the Packers were named NFL Champions six times. This period saw the Packers become the first dynasty of American Football (1929–1931). The second period of success was between 1960–1967, where the Packers won five NFL Championships and the first two Super Bowls. The Packers also won three consecutive NFL Championships for the second time in franchise history (1965–1967). The most recent period of success ranges from 1993–Present, where the franchise has reached the playoffs 22 times, with three Super Bowl appearances, winning two in 1996 and 2010. This period included the 2011 season, where the team won 15 games, the most the Packers have won in a single season.

The Packers have also experienced periods of extended failure in their history. The two most notable times were from 1945–1958, where the franchise never placed higher than 3rd in the league standings and recorded the worst record of any Packers team, going 1–10–1 in 1958. The second period of continued failure occurred between 1968–1991, where the club only went to the playoffs twice, and recorded only six winning seasons.

Season-by-season records

Footnotes

References
General

Specific

 
Green Bay Packers
seasons